Ursus of Solothurn was a 3rd-century Roman Christian venerated as a saint. He was associated very early with the Theban Legion and is recorded in the Roman Martyrology, with Victor of Solothurn on 30 September.

Legend
The Life of Ursus was written by Saint Eucherius of Lyon in the 5th century; it recounts that Ursus was tortured and beheaded at Solothurn under Emperor Maximian and the governor Hyrtacus  for refusing to worship idols around 286. The legend is classed by Bollandist Hippolyte Delehaye among the historical romances.

Veneration

The first church dedicated to Ursus in Solothurn was probably built after Victor of Solothurn]'s remains were taken to Geneva in the late 7th century. The Treaty of Meerssen of 870 mentions a monastery of St. Ursus in Solothurn.

His relics are displayed in churches throughout Switzerland, and his coffin was found in 1519 under the choir altar of St. Ursen. His feast day is September 30.

Iconography
Ursus is depicted as a soldier in arms, often with his head under his arm. He is depicted in the Solothurn Madonna by Hans Holbein the Younger.

Patronage
Ursus is the patron of the  Roman Catholic cathedral in Solothurn, Switzerland, where his body is located.

References

3rd-century births
Saints from Roman Egypt
Roman Catholic saints
3rd-century Christian martyrs
Solothurn
286 deaths